Otakar Švorčík (7 December 1886 – 18 September 1955) was a Czech fencer. He competed at three Olympic Games.

References

External links
 

1886 births
1955 deaths
Czech male fencers
Czechoslovak male fencers
Olympic fencers of Bohemia
Olympic fencers of Czechoslovakia
Fencers at the 1912 Summer Olympics
Fencers at the 1920 Summer Olympics
Fencers at the 1924 Summer Olympics
Sportspeople from Prague